This is a list of media and materials related to the anime series Samurai 7.

Anime 

Samurai 7 is animated by GONZO and directed by Toshifumi Takizawa. The series premiered across Japan on the anime satellite television network, Animax, as an exclusive high definition CS-PPV broadcast, and was also later aired by the network across its other respective networks worldwide, including Southeast Asia, South Asia, Latin America and other regions. FUNimation has acquired the dubbing rights for the North American release. It is airing in America through the Independent Film Channel (using FUNimation's dub) since April 2006 and in high definition on Dish Networks Animania HD channel. It has also been broadcast across Canada by  specialty channel Razer and across Hong Kong by TVB Jade.

Voice actors

The Seven Samurai 
 Kambei Shimada - Masaki Terasoma
 Katsushiro Okamoto - Romi Park
 Kikuchiyo - Kong Kuwata
 Kyuzo - Shin-ichiro Miki
 Gorobei Katayama - Tetsu Inada
 Heihachi Hayashida - Junji Inukai
 Shichiroji - Tōru Kusano

The Village 
 Kirara Mikumari - Fumiko Orikasa
 Komachi Mikumari - Chiwa Saitō
 Rikichi - Tadahisa Saizen
 Okara - Megumi Tano
 Setsu - Atsuko Mine
 Elder Gisaku - Ikuo Nishikawa
 Gosaku - Yōhei Ōbayashi
 Manzo - Naoki Makishima
 Mosuke - Takehiro Murozono
 Yohei - Kenichi Mochizuki

Nobuseri 
 Tanomo - Naoki Makishima
 Genzo - Ryūzaburō Ōtomo
 Sobei - Kazuhiko Kishino

Merchant House 
 Ayamaro - Seiji Sasaki
 Ukyo - Takehito Koyasu
 Tessai - Michihiro Ikemizu
 Hyogo - Takeshi Kusao

Others 
Amanushi - Takehito Koyasu
Chiaki - Tadahori Moriya
Honoka - Kumiko Watanabe
Masamune - Tomomichi Nishimura
Mizuki - Chiaki Osawa
Sanae - Yū Asakawa
Shino - Yu Kobayashi
Warya - Rio Natsuki
Yukino - Rieko Takahashi

Funimation voice actors

The Seven Samurai 
 Kambei Shimada - R. Bruce Elliott
 Katsushiro Okamoto - Sean Michael Teague
 Kikuchiyo - Christopher Sabat
 Kyuzo - Sonny Strait
 Gorobei Katayama - Bob Carter
 Heihachi Hayashida - Greg Ayres
 Shichiroji - Duncan Brannan

The Village 
 Kirara Mikumari - Colleen Clinkenbeard
 Komachi Mikumari - Luci Christian
 Rikichi - J. Michael Tatum
 Okara - Zarah Little
 Setsu - Juli Erickson
 Elder Gisaku - Andrew Haskett
 Gosaku - Christopher Bevins
 Manzo - Mark Stoddard
 Mosuke - Kyle Hebert
 Yohei - Grant James

Nobuseri 
 Tanomo - Scott McNeil
 Genzo - Sean Schemmel
 Sobei - Michael Sinterniklaas
 Syusai - Brett Weaver

Merchant House 
 Ayamaro - Barry Yandell
 Ukyo - Anthony Bowling
 Tessai - Robert McCollum
 Hyogo - Jerry Jewell

Others 
Amanushi - Anthony Bowling
Chiaki - Lucy Small
Honoka - Carrie Savage
Masamune - Brice Armstrong
Mizuki - Laura Bailey
Sanae - Clarine Harp
Shino - Monica Rial
Warya - Jamie Marchi
Yukino - Gwendolyn Lau

Theme music

Samurai 7 Region 1 DVD Releases

External links 
 

Anime and manga lists
Media Information